FPSC may refer to:

 Federal Public Service Commission, a federal agency of Government of Pakistan
 Florida Public Service Commission, a regulatory organization in the state of Florida, US
 Free Piston Stirling Cooler, a type of mechanical refrigerator